State Route 176 (SR 176) is a north–south state highway located entirely within Memphis, Tennessee.

Route description

SR 176 runs from Interstate 240 (I-240) south to the Mississippi state line. The state highway portion varies between two and three lanes on each side. The portion that runs between Knight Arnold Road and Winchester Road is built as a four-lane Freeway. A wide median (with a fairly large drainage ditch) and grade-separated interchanges at major routes exist in this portion. This route is more commonly known as Getwell Road or New Getwell Road (old sections are named Old Getwell Road).

History

The original name was Shotwell Road, after one of the founding families, but was changed in the 1940s as a "good faith" gesture since the local V.A. hospital's address was on that road, and wounded American servicemen were being brought in by the trainload.  A couple of residential blocks are still seen, named Shotwell, north of Park Avenue, in line with Getwell, but not designated as State Highway 176.

Major intersections

References

176
Transportation in Shelby County, Tennessee
Transportation in Memphis, Tennessee